Shinobi, known in Japan as Shinobi 3D, is a Nintendo 3DS video game developed by Griptonite Games (a division of Foundation 9) and published by Sega as part of the Shinobi series, and was released worldwide in November 2011.

Gameplay
The game is primarily controlled with buttons, but there are minigames that make use of the touch screen. Player controls the protagonist Jiro Musashi in arcade style gameplay, similar to the original 2D games. The game typically plays in a 2D sidescrolling fashion, using 3D graphics.

Plot
The game's story begins in the year 1256, Kencho Era Japan, where the young Oboro Clan Leader Jiro Musashi (father of Joe Musashi, the main character from the original Arcade and Sega Genesis Shinobi games) is summoned to defend his home village from the ninja forces of Zeed. After battle, he is sent 800 years into the future, where Zeed now rules with an iron fist. Aided by Sarah, the leader of a local resistance, Jiro continues his battle against Zeed. As he battles on, he begins to uncover a deeper conspiracy (depending on the level of skill and difficulty), a secret mission is unlocked, revealing an ancient alien Orn that instigated the events in the Kamakura era, including the betrayal of Jiro's own teacher, in hopes of creating the most powerful Ninja army in space. After defeating Orn, the alien's spaceship explodes, and Jiro, protected by a Ninjutsu spell is last seen reentering the atmosphere. After landing on Earth, Jiro walks into the horizon, presumably to restart the Oboro Ninja Clan anew. The timeline is altered so Joe Musashi doesn't exist in the 20th Century in this timeline.

Development
The game was revealed in the May 2011 issue of Nintendo Power. Sega originally planned to release the game in September 2011, but due to slow 3DS hardware sales, they postponed the game until November of that year.

Reception
Shinobi 3D has received mixed to positive reviews, receiving an aggregate score of 69 on Metacritic. Destructoid praised Shinobi 3D for having "tons" of content, but noted that the steep difficulty curve and lack of coherent narrative may turn off some players. Official Nintendo Magazine UK similarly stated that "Shinobi won't be to everyone's tastes since we're now in an age where games are expected to be easy enough for everyone", but said it should be enjoyed by players looking for a challenge. GameSpot praised the way the game reconciles difficulty with accessibility, remarking that the game makes only a few missteps in this, and calls Shinobi 3D "among the small number of quality games in the growing 3DS library worthy of a spot on your shelf". However, GamesTM was more critical of Shinobi 3D, judging the "unsympathetic difficulty" of the game as "cheap and archaic within the context of plodding action". According to Eurogamer: "To call this a bad game would be grossly unfair, but it's a truly unexceptional one. For a series like Shinobi, that is dishonour enough".

References

External links
 (in Japanese)

2011 video games
Action video games
Nintendo 3DS games
Nintendo 3DS-only games
Sega video games
Shinobi (series)
Side-scrolling video games
Video games about time travel
Video game sequels
Video games developed in the United States
Video games scored by Takahiro Izutani
Video games with 2.5D graphics
Griptonite Games